Alexia Arisarah Schenkel  (born 15 December 1996) is a Swiss-Thai alpine skier. She competed in slalom and giant slalom at the 2018 Winter Olympics.

Alpine skiing results
All results are sourced from the International Ski Federation (FIS).

Olympic results

References

External links

 Alexia Schenkel at Eurosport

1996 births
Living people
Sportspeople from Zürich
Swiss female alpine skiers
Alexia Arisarah Schenkel
Alexia Arisarah Schenkel
Swiss people of Thai descent
Alexia Arisarah Schenkel
Alpine skiers at the 2018 Winter Olympics
Place of birth missing (living people)
Alexia Arisarah Schenkel